The Old Red Sandstone is an assemblage of rocks in the North Atlantic region largely of Devonian age. It extends in the east across Great Britain, Ireland and Norway, and in the west along the eastern seaboard of North America. It also extends northwards into Greenland and Svalbard. These areas were a part of the ancient continent of Euramerica/Laurussia. In Britain it is a lithostratigraphic unit (a sequence of rock strata) to which stratigraphers accord supergroup status and which is of considerable importance to early paleontology.  For convenience the short version of the term, ORS is often used in literature on the subject. The term was coined to distinguish the sequence from the younger New Red Sandstone which also occurs widely throughout Britain.

Sedimentology 

The Old Red Sandstone describes a suite of sedimentary rocks deposited in a variety of environments during the Devonian but extending back into the late Silurian and on into the earliest part of the Carboniferous. The body of rock, or facies, is dominated by alluvial sediments and conglomerates at its base, and progresses to a combination of dunes, lakes and river sediments.

The familiar red colour of these rocks arises from the presence of iron oxide but not all the Old Red Sandstone is red or sandstone — the sequence also includes conglomerates, mudstones, siltstones and thin limestones and colours can range from grey and green through to red and purple.  These deposits are closely associated with the erosion of the Caledonian Mountain chain which was thrown up by the collision of the former continents of Avalonia, Baltica and Laurentia to form the Old Red Sandstone Continent- an event known as the Caledonian Orogeny.

Many fossils are found within the rocks, including early fishes, arthropods and plants. As is typical with terrestrial red beds, the vast majority of the rock is unfossiliferous; however there are isolated, localized beds within the rock that do contain fossils. Rocks of this age were also laid down in South West England (hence the name 'Devonian'; from Devon) though these are of true marine origin and are not included within the Old Red Sandstone.

Stratigraphy 
Since the Old Red Sandstone consists predominantly of rocks of terrestrial origin, it does not generally contain marine fossils which would otherwise prove useful in correlating one occurrence of the rock with another, both between and within individual sedimentary basins. Accordingly, local stage names were devised and these remain in use to some extent today though there is an increasing use of international stage names. Thus in the Anglo-Welsh Basin, there are frequent references to the Downtonian, Dittonian, Breconian and Farlovian stages in the literature. The existence of a number of distinct sedimentary basins throughout Britain has been established.

Orcadian Basin 
The Orcadian Basin extends over a wide area of North East Scotland and the neighbouring seas. It encompasses the Moray Firth and adjoining land areas, Caithness, Orkney and parts of Shetland. South of the Moray Firth, two distinct sub-basins are recognised at Turriff and at Rhynie. The main basin is considered to be an intramontane basin resulting from crustal rifting associated with post-Caledonian extension, possibly accompanied by strike-slip faulting along the Great Glen Fault system.

Argyll 
There are a scatter of exposures of the Old Red Sandstone around Oban and the Isle of Kerrera on the West Highland coast, this unit is sometimes referred to as the Kerrera Sandstone Formation. The unit is up to 128m thick in its type area and consists of green and red sandstones and conglomerates, typically containing large ( across) elliptical well rounded clasts, accompanied by siltstones, mudstones and limestones. On Kerrera a conglomerate of andesite boulders rests unconformably on Dalradian black, pyritic slates (Easdale Slate) of the Easdale Subgroup. On Oban there is merely an erosional contact incorporating debris of the slate in a basal conglomerate. The ORS around Oban are considered latest Silurian (Pridoli) to earliest Devonian in age. They are interpreted as alluvial fans which filled a depositional basin from the east and northeast.  Small outliers occur near Taynuilt and either side of Loch Avich. The deposits are especially obvious on Kerrera where they form the bedrock across half of the island. These are conformably overlain by peperite and the basaltic and andesitic Lorne plateau lavas. The ORS on Kerrera and isolated localities around Oban are known for their fossils, particularly fish.

Midland Valley of Scotland 
The Midland Valley graben defined by the Highland Boundary Fault in the north and the Southern Uplands Fault in the south harbours not only a considerable amount of Old Red Sandstone sedimentary rocks but also igneous rocks of this age associated with extensive volcanism. There is a continuous outcrop along the Highland Boundary Fault from Stonehaven on the North Sea coast to Helensburgh and beyond to Arran.  A more disconnected series of outcrops occur along the line of the Southern Uplands Fault from Edinburgh to Girvan. Old Red Sandstone often occurs in conjunction with conglomerate formations, one such noteworthy cliffside exposure being the Fowlsheugh Nature Reserve, Kincardineshire.

Scottish borders 
A series of outcrops occur from East Lothian southwards through Berwickshire. Hutton's famous unconformity at Siccar Point occurs within this basin - see History of study below.

Anglo-Welsh Basin 
This relatively large basin extends across much of South Wales from southern Pembrokeshire in the west through Carmarthenshire into Powys and Monmouthshire and through the southern Welsh Marches, notably into Herefordshire, Worcestershire and Gloucestershire. Outliers in Somerset and north Devon complete the extent of this basin.

With the exception of south Pembrokeshire, all parts of the basin are represented by a range of lithologies assigned to the Lower Devonian and to the Upper Devonian, the contact between the two being unconformable and representing the complete omission of any Middle Devonian sequence. The lowermost formations are of upper Silurian age, these being the Downton Castle Sandstone Formation and the overlying Raglan Mudstone Formation except in Pembrokeshire where a more complex series of formations is recognised. In the east of the basin, the top of the Raglan Mudstone is marked by a well-developed calcrete, the Bishop's Frome Limestone. The lowermost Devonian formation is the St Maughans Formation, itself overlain by the Brownstones Formation though with an intervening Senni Formation over much of the area. The Upper Devonian sequence is rather thinner and comprises a series of formations which are more laterally restricted. In the Brecon Beacons, the Plateau Beds Formation is unconformably overlain by the Grey Grits Formation though further east these divisions are replaced by the Quartz Conglomerate Group which is itself subdivided into a variety of different formations.

Pembrokeshire 
The sequence in Pembrokeshire differs from that of the main part of the basin and falls into two parts.

In North Pembrokeshire to the north of the Ritec Fault, both the middle and upper ORS are missing with only the lower ORS present; this is divided into an earlier Milford Haven Group comprising in ascending order, the Red Cliff, Sandy Haven and Gelliswick Bay formations and a later Cosheston Group with, again in ascending order, its constituent Llanstadwell, Burton Cliff, Mill Bay, Lawrenny Cliff and New Shipping formations. These respectively equate with the Temeside, Raglan Mudstone and St Maughans formations of the central and eastern part of the basin. 
- middle and upper ORS missing -
 Cosheston Group
 New Shipping Formation
 Lawrenny Cliff Formation
 Mill Bay Formation
 Burton Cliff Formation
 Llanstadwell Formation
 Milford Haven Group
 Gelliswick Bay Formation
 Sandy Haven Formation (inc. Townsend Tuff Beds)
 Albion Sands Formation / Lindsway Bay Formation
 Red Cliff Formation

In south Pembrokeshire to the south of the Ritec Fault, the lower ORS is represented by, in ascending order, the Freshwater East, Moors Cliff and Freshwater West formations. These are unconformably overlain by the Ridgeway Conglomerate Formation. The middle ORS is missing whilst the Upper ORS is represented by the Gupton and West Angle formations.  
 Skrinkle Sandstone Group
 West Angle Formation
 Gupton Formation
 - part of middle ORS missing -
 Ridgeway Conglomerate Formation
 - part of middle ORS missing -
 Milford Haven Group
 Freshwater West Formation (inc. Rat Island Mudstone Member and Conigar Pit Sandstone Member)
 Moor Cliffs Formation (inc. Chapel point calcretes member and Townsend Tuff Bed)
 Freshwater East Formation

The Freshwater East Formation, and corresponding Red Cliff Formation of north Pembrokeshire, are both late Silurian in age.

Anglesey 
A small and separate basin exists here where both alluvial and lacustrine deposits are recorded. Both the middle and upper ORS are missing but the lower ORS is represented, in ascending order, by the Bodafon, Traeth Bach, Porth y Mor and Traeth Lligwy formations. Calcretes are also recorded representing carbonate-rich soils developed between periods of sediment deposition. The present day outcrop occupies a narrow zone from Dulas Bay on Anglesey's northeast coast, southwards to the town of Llangefni.

History of study 
In 1787 James Hutton noted what is now known as Hutton's Unconformity at Inchbonny, Jedburgh, and in early 1788 he set off with John Playfair to the Berwickshire coast and found more examples of this sequence in the valleys of the Tower and Pease Burns near Cockburnspath. They then took a boat trip from Dunglass Burn east along the coast with the geologist Sir James Hall of Dunglass and at Siccar Point found what Hutton called "a beautiful picture of this junction washed bare by the sea", where 345-million-year-old Old Red Sandstone overlies 425-million-year-old Silurian greywacke.

In the early 19th century, the paleontology of the formation was studied intensively by Hugh Miller, Henry Thomas De la Beche, Roderick Murchison, and Adam Sedgwick—Sedgwick's interpretation was the one that placed it in the Devonian: he coined the name of that period. The term 'Old Red Sandstone' was originally used in 1821 by Scottish naturalist and mineralogist Robert Jameson to refer to the red rocks which underlay the 'Mountain Limestone' i.e. the Carboniferous Limestone. They were thought at that time to be the British version of Germany's Rotliegendes, which is in fact of Permian age.  Many of the science of stratigraphy's early debates were about the Old Red Sandstone.

In older geological works predating theories of plate tectonics, the United States' Catskill Delta formation is sometimes referred to as part of the Old Red Sandstone. In the modern day it is recognized that the two are not stratigraphically continuous but are very similar due to being formed at approximately the same time by the same processes.

Use as a building stone 

The Old Red Sandstone has been widely used as a building stone across those regions where it outcrops. Notable examples of its use can be found in the area surrounding Stirling, Stonehaven, Perth and Tayside. The inhabitants of Caithness at the northeastern tip of Scotland also used the stone to a considerable extent.  Old Red Sandstone has also frequently been used in buildings in Herefordshire, Monmouthshire and the former Brecknockshire (now south Powys) of south Wales.

Notable buildings 

Canada
 New York Life Insurance Building, Montreal

England
 Goodrich Castle, Herefordshire
 Ross-on-Wye market hall, Herefordshire 
 Shrewsbury Castle, Shropshire 
 Hereford Cathedral, Herefordshire

Scotland
 Arbroath Abbey, Angus
 Muchalls Castle, Aberdeenshire 
 St Magnus Cathedral, Orkney
 Stonehaven Tolbooth, Aberdeenshire 
Wales
 Raglan Castle, Monmouthshire
 Tintern Abbey, Monmouthshire
 Brecon Cathedral, Powys

See also 

 New Red Sandstone
 Geology of Great Britain

References

External links 

 Cawdor Castle — built from Old Red Sandstone

Geologic groups of Europe
Geologic groups of North America
Geologic formations of Canada
Geologic formations of Greenland
Geologic formations of Ireland
Geologic formations of Norway
Geologic formations of the United Kingdom
Geologic formations of the United States
Carboniferous paleontological sites
Carboniferous System of Europe
Devonian System of Europe
Silurian System of North America
Devonian System of North America
Carboniferous System of North America
Silurian paleontological sites
Devonian Canada
Devonian England
Devonian Ireland
Devonian Greenland
Devonian Norway
Devonian Scotland
Devonian United Kingdom
Devonian United States
Silurian Canada
Silurian England
Silurian Ireland
Silurian Greenland
Silurian Norway
Silurian Scotland
Silurian United Kingdom
Silurian United States
Carboniferous England
Carboniferous Norway
Carboniferous Scotland
Carboniferous United Kingdom
Sandstone formations
Conglomerate formations
Limestone formations
Mudstone formations
Shale formations
Siltstone formations
Geologic formations with imbedded sand dunes
Aeolian deposits
Fluvial deposits
Lacustrine deposits
Fossiliferous stratigraphic units of Europe
Fossiliferous stratigraphic units of North America
Paleontology in Canada
Paleontology in England
Paleontology in Ireland
Paleontology in Greenland
Paleontology in Norway
Paleontology in the United Kingdom
Paleontology in the United States